Ahlstrand is a surname. Notable people with the surname include:

Anna Ahlstrand (born 1980), Swedish footballer
Bruce Ahlstrand, Canadian academic
Jonas Ahlstrand (born 1990), Swedish cyclist
Linné Ahlstrand (1936–1967), American model and actress